Chasse, chassé, or châsse may refer to one of the following:

Chassé, a dance step.
Chasse (casket), a medieval casket with sloping roofs like a house 
David Hendrik Chassé, Dutch military commander and Napoleontic general
Chassé, Sarthe, a commune of the Sarthe department, France
Chasse-sur-Rhône, a commune of the Isère department, France
"Chasse" (song), a song by Kaori Utatsuki

See also
Chase (disambiguation)